Kamas may mean

 Kamas, Utah
 Kamas (raga), a ragam in Carnatic music
 KAMAS (program), an acronym for Knowledge and Mind Amplification System, an outline processor
 Kamasins, a Samoyedic people
 Kamassian language, an extinct Samoyedic language spoken by the Kamasins before the 20th century

See also
 Kama
 Kama (disambiguation)